Izak Ogoai (born January 1, 1989) is an Indonesian footballer that currently plays for Persidafon Dafonsoro in the Indonesia Super League.

References

External links

1989 births
Living people
Papuan people
Indonesian footballers
Persema Malang players
Persidafon Dafonsoro players
Liga 1 (Indonesia) players
Association football midfielders
Sportspeople from Papua